Auchinleck is a village in East Ayrshire, Scotland.

Auchinleck may also refer to:

People
 Claude Auchinleck (1884–1981), British field marshal, Commander-in-Chief in India, Supreme Commander of British forces in India and Pakistan
 Alexander Boswell, Lord Auchinleck (1706–1782), a judge of the supreme courts of Scotland.

Other uses
 Auchinleck House, an 18th-century mansion in Scotland near the town of Auchinleck
 Auchinleck Talbot F.C., a Scottish football club
 Auchinleck chronicle, a brief history of Scotland during the reign of James II (1437–1460)
 Auchinleck railway station
 Auchinleck Castle, East Ayrshire, a castle on the eastern bank of the Lugar Water, East Ayrshire, Scotland, built by the Auchinleck family in the 12th century
 Auchinleck manuscript, an illuminated manuscript copied on parchment in the 14th century in London

See also
 Affleck (disambiguation), a related name
 Auchenleck Castle, Angus, Scotland

Scottish surnames
English-language surnames